The 1955 All-Southwest Conference football team consists of American football players chosen by various organizations for All-Southwest Conference teams for the 1955 college football season.  The selectors for the 1955 season included the Associated Press (AP) and the United Press (UP).  Players selected as first-team players by both the AP and UP are designated in bold.

All Southwest selections

Backs
 Chuck Curtis, TCU (AP-1)
 Jim Swink, TCU (AP-1)
 Preston Carpenter, Arkansas (AP-1)
 Walter Fondren, Texas (AP-1)
 Henry Moore, Arkansas (AP-1)

Ends
 Menan Schriewer, Texas (AP-1)
 Hank Gremminger, Baylor (AP-1)
 Gene Stallings, Texas A&M (AP-1)

Tackles
 Forrest Gregg, SMU (AP-1)
 Norman Hamilton, TCU (AP-1)

Guards
 Herb Gray, Texas (AP-1)
 Dennis Goehring, Texas A&M (AP-1)

Centers
 Hugh Pitts, TCU (AP-1)

Key
AP = Associated Press

UP = United Press

Bold = Consensus first-team selection of both the AP and UP

See also
1955 College Football All-America Team

References

All-Southwest Conference
All-Southwest Conference football teams